Seamus O'Connell is an Australian former professional rugby league footballer who played in the 1980s. He played for St. George, Illawarra Steelers and Eastern Suburbs in the New South Wales Rugby League (NSWRL) competition.

Playing career
O'Connell made his first grade debut for Eastern Suburbs in round 1 of the 1983 NSWRFL season against Western Suburbs at Sydney Sports Ground. After making 22 appearances for Easts, O'Connell departed the club and signed for Illawarra. O'Connell's two years at Illawarra were not successful with the club finishing with back to back Wooden Spoon's. In 1987, O'Connell joined St. George and played 18 games for the club mainly as a prop before being released at the end of 1988.

References

Illawarra Steelers players
Sydney Roosters players
St. George Dragons players
Australian rugby league players
Rugby league props
Rugby league second-rows
1961 births
Living people